Jhamir Ordain Kareem Alexander (born July 29, 1993), commonly known as Jhamir Ordain, is a Costa Rican professional footballer who plays as a right-back for Santos de Guápiles F.C. in Costa Rica.

Having made his debut with Santos de Guapiles in 2010, Ordain was training with the Portland Timbers in January 2017. He scored in a pre-season match for the Oregon based side. However, reports in Costa Rica said he was to be loaned back to Santos until the end of the season before being due to meet up with the Major League Soccer side at the end of the 2017 season to join up with compatriots Roy Miller and David Guzmán. Instead however, Ordain was signed by C.S. Herediano in May 2017.

International career
Ordian received his first call up to the senior national team in 2016 for Costa Rica’s friendly match against Russia. Ordain made his Costa Rica national team debut in the 2017 Copa Centroamericana playing in 3–0 win over Belize. He also played in a 0–0 draw against Nicaragua.

References 

Living people
1993 births
Costa Rican footballers
Association football fullbacks
Costa Rica under-20 international footballers
Costa Rica international footballers